Ganadevata (English: The People) is a 1978 Bengali drama film directed by Tarun Majumdar, based on a novel by same name by Tarashankar Bandopadhyay. The film stars Soumitra Chatterjee, Ajitesh Bannerjee, Samit Bhanja, Rabi Ghosh and Anup Kumar in lead roles. The epic novel is set in the 1920s during the British Raj, about the breakdown of socio-economic structures, impact of industrialization and non-cooperation movement in rural Bengal. It had also won the writer Bandopadhyay, the 1966 Jnanpith Award.

At the 26th National Film Awards (1978), it won the award for Best Popular Film Providing Wholesome Entertainment and Best Child Artist Award for Kanchan De Biswas.

Cast
 Soumitra Chatterjee as Debu Pandit
 Kali Banerjee
 Sandhya Roy as Durga
 Tapen Chatterjee as Tara Napit
 Ajitesh Bandopadhyay
 Samit Bhanja
 Nilkantha Sengupta as Tarini, the singer
 Rabi Ghosh as Haren Ghosal
 Anup Kumar
 Santosh Dutta as Doctor & Social activist for the rural poor people
 Debraj Ray
 Madhabi Mukherjee
 Sumitra Mukherjee
 Monu Mukhopadhyay
 Anamika Saha
 Santu Mukhopadhyay
 Nimu Bhowmik

Music 
The music of the film was composed by Hemanta Mukherjee. The lyrics were penned by Pulak Bandyopadhyay, Mukul Dutta, Tarashankar Bandopadhyay and Lt. Ganga Charan Sarkar. The songs are:

1. Bhor Hoilo Jagata Jagilo (sung by Manna Dey)

2. Bhalo Chhilo Sishubela (Sung by Sipra Bose)

3. Shone Re Boli (sung by Manna Dey)

4. Dekhe Ja Rey Dekhe Ja (sung by Hemanta Mukherjee and Aarti Mukherjee)

5. Ek Ghentu Tar Saat Beta (sung by Manna Dey)

6. Eso Poush Sonar Poush (Sung by chorus)

7. Lathi Kheye Aar Katodin (sung by Manna Dey)

Legacy
After the success,A Express which named the Ganadevta Express .

References

External links
 

Bengali-language Indian films
Films based on Indian novels
Films set in the 1920s
Films set in West Bengal
Films set in the British Raj
Films scored by Hemant Kumar
Best Popular Film Providing Wholesome Entertainment National Film Award winners
1970s Bengali-language films